Clarissa Molina (born Clarissa María Molina Contreras; September 23, 1991) is a Dominican model and beauty queen who won Miss Dominican Republic 2015 and represented the Dominican Republic at the Miss Universe 2015 pageant. She later won the title of Nuestra Belleza Latina 2016 after having placed third Runner-Up the previous year. She is the winner of Mira Quien Baila All-Stars 2019, and now works as a reporter with Univision in El Gordo y La Flaca.

Personal life
Molina was born in Santiago de los Caballeros, Dominican Republic and is the daughter of Domingo Molina and Clara Contreras. At the age of 11, her parents separated and moved to New York City. She was left in the Dominican Republic with her stepmother. At age 15 she and her siblings moved to New Jersey with their uncle and cousins. She resides in Miami, Florida after winning the Nuestra Belleza Latina pageant. She holds both Dominican and American citizenships.

Pageantry

Nuestra Belleza Latina 2015
Molina auditioned for Univision's reality show and beauty pageant Nuestra Belleza Latina 2015 in New York City on October 4, 2014. Judge Jomari Goyso and guest judges Daniel Arenas and Veronica Bastos did not give her a pass to enter the competition due to them seeing her as arrogant. Days later head judge Osmel Sousa went to her home in New Jersey to personally invite her to be part of the competition.
After several eliminations, she was selected to be part of the 12 finalists who enter the mansion of Nuestra Belleza Latina where she became a favorite among both the judges and audience. After 13 weeks of competition, she made it to the Top 4 and finished as third Runner-Up. The eventual winner was Francisca Lachapel of the Dominican Republic.

Miss Dominican Republic 2015
After Clarissa had finished competing in Nuestra Belleza Latina Clarrisa competed in Miss Dominican Republic 2015 representing the province of Espaillat where she was eventually crowned the winner, earning the right to represent the country at the 2015 Miss Universe pageant.

Miss Universe 2015
Clarissa represented the Dominican Republic at Miss Universe 2015 where she competed to succeed outgoing titleholder Paulina Vega of Colombia. She became the favorite of the analysts to win the title based on her preliminary performance. On the coronation night, she eventually finished in the Top 10. A later evaluate give her the sixth place. The eventual winner was Pia Wurtzbach of the Philippines. She is one of the candidates who consoled Wurtzbach after the latter won the title.

NBL VIP 2016 - Nuestra Belleza Latina 2016

In 2016, Clarissa Molina was chosen by the production of Nuestra Belleza Latina to compete in Nuestra Belleza Latina 2016. The season was referred to as "NBL VIP" and was the shows first All Star season, consisting of twenty-six returning non-winning/runner up contestants representing the shows nine seasons for a second chance to win the title. On May 22, 2016, after 6 weeks of competition Clarissa Molina was crowned as Nuestra Belleza Latina 2016, making her the second Dominican to obtain the title, after Francisca Lachapel in 2015. Clarissa and Francisca's wins made the Dominican Republic the first nation to obtain crowns in two consecutive years. Clarissa's win also ties the Dominican Republic and Mexico for the second most wins, each nation obtaining two crowns. She is also the second winner to have been born in the 1990s after Marisela de Montecristo.

Career
Molina currently works as a social media correspondent on the TV show El Gordo y la Flaca.

Filmography 
Her dream was always to be a Hollywood star, and in 2018 she got her wish. Molina starred the Dominican movie Que Leon, accompanied by the reggaeton artist Ozuna. The movie is about how a relationship blooms between two people with different social statuses.

References

Living people
Beauty pageant contestants
1991 births
Dominican Republic female models
Dominican Republic people of Spanish descent
Miss Universe 2015 contestants
Dominican Republic beauty pageant winners
Nuestra Belleza Latina winners